The Singles Collection 1981–1993 is a greatest hits album by English singer Kim Wilde, released on 6 September 1993 by MCA Records.

Content
The album contains fifteen Top 20 hits from the UK and German charts, but omits hits such as "Hey Mr. Heartache" (Top 15 Germany) and "It's Here" (Top 15 in Sweden, Norway and Switzerland). Wilde recorded two new songs for the album—"In My Life" and the dancefloor-influenced single "If I Can't Have You" (a cover of the Yvonne Elliman song), which became her last UK Top 20 hit to date; in Australia it was one of the biggest hits of her career, reaching number three.

Commercial performance
The album was certified Gold in the UK (where it reached number 11 on the UK Albums Chart), Germany and Australia. It was also released in the United States (the first since Close) and has, according to SoundScan, sold 36,000 copies there.

Track listing
"Kids in America" – 3:25 from Kim Wilde
"Chequered Love" – 3:20 from Kim Wilde
"Water on Glass" – 3:35 from Kim Wilde
"Cambodia" (Single version) – 3:56 from Select
"View from a Bridge" – 3:29 from Select
"Child Come Away" – 4:04 Non-album single
"Love Blonde" – 3:31 from Catch as Catch Can
"The Second Time" – 3:52 from Teases & Dares
"Rage to Love" – 4:17 from Teases & Dares
"You Keep Me Hangin' On" – 4:14 from Another Step
"Another Step (Closer to You)" (7" remix) – 3:30 from Another Step
"You Came" (7" version) – 3:29 from Close
"Never Trust a Stranger" (Single mix) – 4:04 from Close
"Four Letter Word" – 4:02 from Close
"Love Is Holy" – 4:01 from Love Is
"If I Can't Have You" – 3:26 Previously unreleased
"In My Life" (Album version) – 3:44 Previously unreleased

Video album
A collection featuring twelve of Wilde's music videos was also made available. It was released on 1 December 1993 on VHS format.

Track listing
"Kids in America"
"Chequered Love"
"Cambodia"
"View from a Bridge"
"You Keep Me Hangin' On"
"Another Step (Closer to You)"
"You Came"
"Never Trust a Stranger"
"Four Letter Word"
"Love Is Holy"
"If I Can't Have You"
"Say You Really Want Me" (12" version)

Charts

Weekly charts

Year-end charts

Certifications and sales

References

1993 greatest hits albums
1993 video albums
Albums produced by Rod Temperton
Kim Wilde compilation albums
MCA Records compilation albums
MCA Records video albums
Music video compilation albums